Zureiqiya, is a Syrian village located in Markaz Rif Dimashq District, Rif Dimashq. According to the Syria Central Bureau of Statistics (CBS), Zuraiqiya had a population of 749 in the 2004 census. Nearby localities include Arkis, Ghabaghib, Kanakir, and Deir al-Bukht.

References 

Populated places in Markaz Rif Dimashq District